NGC 190 is a pair of interacting galaxies located in the constellation Pisces. This galaxy is due to the collision of the two galaxies around 30 million years ago. It was discovered in 1894.

References

External links
 

0190
Interacting galaxies
Pisces (constellation)